Choibalsan District is a sum (district) of Dornod Province in eastern Mongolia. Sum center is 55 km North from the Dornod aimag capital Choibalsan city. Sum center has railway station Kherlengol on the Borzya (Russia) - Choibalsan city line. In 2009, its population was 2,691.

References 

Districts of Dornod Province